Arturo Stable is a Cuban master percussionist and composer. His diverse musical experience and unique sound have allowed him to work in many environments, but he is best known as a Latin jazz percussionist. He has performed in many famous jazz festivals around the world, such as the San Francisco Jazz Festival and the Vitoria-Gasteiz jazz festival, and has also played with some of the most notable jazz performers, including Paquito D'Rivera. Esperanza Spalding and David Sánchez,

Early life

Youth
Stable was born in Santiago de Cuba, the cradle of the island nation's most important center of culture and home of such elemental music styles as the Guajira and Son. Nurtured in a family that is deeply involved in the performing and visual arts and encouraged by his father Arturo Sr., a musician and a painter, the youngster began his formal study of music at the age of four, taking piano and theory lessons.

Early education
When his family moved to Havana, Stable continued his music education. He earned his first degree, in percussion, at the Amadeo Roldán Conservatory, an esteemed institution that has over the decades groomed the talents of countless other celebrated Cuban musicians, among them pianists Gonzalo Rubalcaba and Hilario Durán and saxophonist Yosvany Terry.
In 1993, Stable relocated to Puebla, Mexico, a metropolis south of Mexico City, where he polished his skills as a percussionist working as a sideman, performing everything from Latin jazz to rock and traditional Latin styles. He also began his career as an educator, teaching classical and Afro-Cuban percussion at the Puebla State University (Benemérita Universidad Autónoma de Puebla). At the same time, he pursued a post-graduate degree in music education from the Puebla State Development University.

Career development

2001–07
In 2001, Stable received a scholarship to study at the Berklee College of Music. By 2003 he had earned a degree in Contemporary Writing and Production and cultivated friendships with many of the musicians who accompany him on his solo artist career. After graduating from Berklee, he released his first album as a leader, called 3rd Step, in 2004. The album's name had its origins in a three-step process that Stable had planned to fulfill his dream of becoming a skillful musician. The first step involved moving to the U.S. in order to have the chance to fulfill his career goals. The second step consisted of furthering his learning and growing musically. Finally, the third step was to create a recording where he could apply all the lessons he had learned (thus far). Stable's debut album was received with warm reviews, including from Latin Beat Magazine, which stated: "Stable, who also composed and arranged, shows that he has staying power with this first project."

In the years following his debut album, Stable expanded his musical horizons and enriched his cultural knowledge. In July 2006 he played as a member of Javier Vercher's Sexteto for the 30th edition of the Vitoria-Gasteiz jazz festival (Spain).
Stable contributed as a co-founder of Musinetwork School of Music (currently the most important music education website for Spanish speakers) in 2007. There, he has reached music students from all over the world who cannot afford the cost of studying abroad with great professors and has helped them master the skills and knowledge they will need to become talented musicians.

Also in 2007, Stable released his second album as leader, Notes on Canvas, to several positive reviews including that of JazzTimes magazine, which stated: "Emotive melodies and masterful arrangements reflect his subjects' origins, while Stable thrusts directly to the center with powerful rhythmic leadership". In this superb Jazz masterpiece that includes the participation of more than a dozen of great musicians, Stable composed each tune inspired by 9 different paintings that Stable chose from his favorite pieces of art. The album's release was celebrated on December at Cachaça Jazz Club,
where Stable led a stellar quintet, featuring saxophonist Miguel Zenon, pianist Robert Rodriguez, bassist Edward Perez and drummer Henry Cole.

2008–present
Stable played a major role in the 10th International Puebla Festival (Mexico) in September 2008. During the closing of the event, Stable played as a featured guest with the Puebla State Symphony Orchestra,
which performed one of Stable's compositions, "Suite Omnira".
Following the success from the previous year, Stable returned to Mexico as the Adjunct Artistic Director of the first Puebla Jazz Festival in 2009.
Here, he collaborated with the Puebla State University and other sponsoring institutions to bring an impressive arrangement of great musicians, including Newman Taylor Baker, James Newton, Dave Samuels and Stable himself among many others.

In 2009, Stable also released his third album as leader, Call, which won "best album of the week" in the Latin Jazz Corner
and received great reviews from many notable sources. Latin Jazz Network described it as "craftsmanship at its finest."
A few months after the album's release in 2010, DRUM Magazine wrote a two-page article about Stable and this newly released album, stating that Call "redefines the outer limits of Latin jazz through complex and compelling original works and an outpouring of virtuosic performances by Stable and his quintet."

While working resolutely in his career as a performer, Stable's never-ending thirst for knowledge made him return to the academy to pursue a higher degree in music. In 2010 Stable acquired a master's degree from the University of the Arts in Philadelphia.

In January 2012, Stable teamed up with Cuban pianist Elio Villafranca for an album entitled Dos y mas, on which the duo's similar backgrounds and musically rich experiences can be heard "as these two meld their minds and marry their musical intentions to create a program of organic, original music."
JazzTimes magazine stated that "their kinship goes far beyond technical facility or theory. It's more spiritual."

Stable currently resides in the U.S. where he also serves as an endorser of and clinician for Ritmo Percussion. Later in 2012, Stable is also preparing to release in partnership with Ritmo Studios a new line of instruments many of which are his own design. This master percussionist and talented composer is one of the most prominent upcoming Latin Jazz talents of his time.

Discography

Albums as leader
3rd Step (Origen Records, 2004). Arturo's first album as a band leader.
Notes on Canvas (Origen Records, 2007) – with the participation of more than 15 musicians, featuring among them Grammy Award winners Paquito D'Rivera and David Sánchez.
Call (Origen Records, 2009) – a quintet outing showcasing pianist Aruan Ortiz, bassist Edward Perez, saxophonist Javier Vercher and drummer Francisco Mela, with special guest Ian Izquierdo on violin.

Albums as co-leader
Dos Y Mas (Motéma, 2012) – the debut recording of Elio Villafranca and Arturo Stable's piano and percussion collaboration.

References

External links
 Official site

1975 births
Living people
People from Santiago de Cuba
Cuban percussionists
Cuban composers
Male composers
Motéma Music artists
Cuban male musicians